Christine Wyrtzen is a contemporary Christian musician whose music usually falls into the inspirational style.

She was nominated for a Dove Award in 1982. She hosts a daily radio program, Daughters of Promise. She has also written two books, Carry Me: Christine Wyrtzen's Discoveries on the Journey into God's Arms and Long Live the Child: Devotions Designed for Daughters of Promise.

Partial discography 
A Little Bit of Sunshine (1976)
Have You Ever Said Thank You (1977)
Precious (1978)
Simply Love (1980)
Back Home (1980)
My Best To You (1980)
Christine's Christmas (1982)
Critter County (1984)
For Those Who Hurt (1984)
Person To Person (1986)
Daughter of Promise (1998)
Suspended In The Spirit (2006)
Classic Christine (2008)
Alto Flute Christmas (2009)

External links
Official website
Where Are They Now: Christine Wyrtzen, archive at 
Christine Wyrzten Albums Music Info & Discography

American performers of Christian music
American Christian writers
Living people
Year of birth missing (living people)
21st-century American musicians
20th-century American musicians